Sri Valli or Srivalli may refer to
 Sri Valli (1945 film), an Indian Tamil-language film
 Sri Valli (1961 film), an Indian Tamil-language film
 Srivalli (2017 film), an Indian Telugu-language film
 Srivalli, a character from Pushpa
 "Srivalli", a song from Pushpa: The Rise – Part 1